Augustine Cheevers (1686 – 1778) was an Irish Roman Catholic clergyman A member of the Order of Saint Augustine (OSA).

Cheevers was born in Killian, County Galway in 1686, one of the six sons of John Chevers and Ellis Geoghegan. Dr. Cheevers was Bishop of Ardagh from 1751 to 1756 and Bishop of Meath from then until his death in Randelstown, aged 92 on 18 August 1778. He is buried in Oristown, County Meath, in Donaghpatrick Cemetery.
His uncle Edward Chevers, was made Viscount Mount Leinster by King James II for whom he was  Aide-de-Camp at the battle of the boyne, and it is with Viscount Mount Leinster, that Augustine is supposed to have aged 14 gone to France, where he was educated in Paris.

Due to persecution of the Catholic Church and under the penal laws unable to train priests in Ireland, he  founded Burses for students from the diocese, in the College of Douai, France.

References

1686 births
1778 deaths
Roman Catholic bishops of Ardagh
Roman Catholic bishops of Meath
18th-century Roman Catholic bishops in Ireland